Bobby L. Hogue (March 26, 1939 – January 2, 2023) was an American politician. He was a member of the Arkansas House of Representatives, serving from 1979 to 1998. Hogue was a member of the Democratic Party.

Hogue died on January 2, 2023, at the age of 83.

References

1939 births
2023 deaths
20th-century American politicians
Democratic Party members of the Arkansas House of Representatives
Politicians from Jonesboro, Arkansas
People from New Albany, Mississippi
Speakers of the Arkansas House of Representatives